Aeva Maurelle is a German metal singer, best known for being the former co-lead vocalist of the alternative metal band , and the session singer of the symphonic metal band Xandria from 2017 to 2019.

Musical career 
In 2013, after she tried her luck with another band and that didn't work out, she was invited to join Aeverium and they started recording their EP The Harvest. Later on, their debut album Break Out was released in 2015, with follow-up Time being released in early 2017. During the European tour with Aeverium and Kamelot in 2016, Aeva was invited to perform on stage.

On 12 September 2017, Xandria announced Aeva would be filling in temporarily for Dianne van Giersbergen in November and December, whilst Van Giersbergen departed the following day. Xandria continued touring with Aeva until 2019. During this time, a replacement in Aeverium was found in Micky Houijsmans (ex End of the Dream). Later on, during the tour with Xandria she joined Secret Rule on stage, performing alongside guest singer Ailyn. Aeva left Aeverium on 11 September 2018.

In 2020, Aeva joined forces with Maxi Nil for a project called She & Her Darkness. She will also perform lead and backing vocals for Vivaldi Metal Project's upcoming second studio album.

Maurelle also leads a solo career; she published her first single, Dreamer, on 12 November 2020.

Discography

Solo career 
Singles
 Dreamer (2020)

With Aeverium 
EPs
 The Harvest (2013)
Albums
 Break Out (2015)
 Time (2017)

With She & Her Darkness 
Singles
 The Colors of My Heart (2020)

Guest appearances 
With Nachtblut
 Apotasie (2017) – vocals on "Einsam"

References

External links

Women heavy metal singers
Living people
German women singers
German heavy metal singers
Year of birth missing (living people)